"Tra le granite e le granate" ("Between the slushes and the grenades") is a song by Italian singer-songwriter Francesco Gabbani. The song was released as a digital download on 8 May 2017 by BMG Rights Management as the second single from his third studio album Magellano (2017). The song peaked at number 19 on the Italian Singles Chart. The title is also written "Tra le granite E le granate", with a capital E for the word for "summer", Estate in Italian, as Gabbani said in an interview with La Stampa.

Music video
A music video to accompany the release of "Tra le granite E le granate" was first released onto YouTube on 8 May 2017 at a total length of three minutes and nine seconds.

Track listing

Charts

Weekly charts

Year-end charts

Certifications

Release history

References

2017 singles
2017 songs
Warner Music Group singles
Songs written by Francesco Gabbani
Francesco Gabbani songs